Mount Ostenso is a mountain (4,180 m) 2 nautical miles (3.7 km) south of Mount Giovinetto in the main ridge of the Sentinel Range, Antarctica. First mapped by the Marie Byrd Land Traverse Party (1957–58) led by Charles R. Bentley, and named for Ned A. Ostenso, traverse seismologist at Byrd Station (1957) and a member of the party.

See also
 Mountains in Antarctica

References

 

Ellsworth Mountains
Mountains of Ellsworth Land
Four-thousanders of Antarctica